Brian Jonathan Whitfield (born 14 March 1959) is a former South African First-class cricketer.

He played with Natal and Northern Transvaal and was one of the South African Cricket Annual's Cricketers of the Year in 1987.

References

1959 births
Living people
South African cricketers
KwaZulu-Natal cricketers
Northerns cricketers
Alumni of Northwood School, Durban
Cricketers from Durban